Damion Kemar Jacobs (born 15 February 1985) is a Jamaican cricketer who plays for the Jamaican national side in West Indian domestic cricket. He is a right-arm leg spin bowler.

From Kingston, Jacobs made his first-class debut for Jamaica during the 2013–14 Regional Four Day Competition. In only his fourth match, which was the competition's final, he took figures of 8/47 in the Windward Islands' first innings (and 10/122 for the match). Only four Jamaicans have taken better figures in an innings in first-class cricket. Jacobs continued his good form during the 2014–15 season, taking 48 wickets to finish as Jamaica's leading wicket-taker (and fifth in the competition). His season included figures of 5/27 and 7/54 against the Leeward Islands (in separate matches), 5/67 against Guyana, and 7/72 against the Windwards.

He was selected in the 2017 CPL player draft by the Barbados Tridents. He made his Twenty20 debut for Barbados Tridents in the 2017 Caribbean Premier League on 20 August 2017.

In May 2018, he was selected to play for the Leeward Islands national cricket team in the Professional Cricket League draft, ahead of the 2018–19 season. In June 2021, he was selected to take part in the Minor League Cricket tournament in the United States following the players' draft.

References

External links
Player profile and statistics at CricketArchive
Player profile and statistics at ESPNcricinfo

1985 births
Living people
Barbados Royals cricketers
Jamaica cricketers
Jamaican cricketers
Sportspeople from Kingston, Jamaica